Marichalar may refer to:
 Jaime de Marichalar
 Victoria Federica de Marichalar y Borbón
 Felipe Juan Froilán de Marichalar y Borbón